Anna Badegruber (born 14 January 1997) is an Austrian professional racing cyclist, who currently rides for UCI Women's Continental Team .

See also
 List of 2016 UCI Women's Teams and riders

References

External links
 

1997 births
Living people
Austrian female cyclists
People from Vöcklabruck District
Sportspeople from Upper Austria
21st-century Austrian women